The 1980 Utah State Aggies football team represented Utah State University during the 1980 NCAA Division I-A football season as a member of the Pacific Coast Athletic Association (PCAA). The Aggies were led by fifth-year head coach Bruce Snyder and played their home games at Romney Stadium in Logan, Utah. They finished the season with a record of six wins and five losses (6–5, 4–1 PCAA).

Schedule

Roster

References

Utah State
Utah State Aggies football seasons
Utah State Aggies football